Mark Goodlad (born 9 September 1979) is an English former professional footballer who is John Askey's assistant manager at  club Hartlepool United.

Goodlad was a goalkeeper and began his career at Nottingham Forest, playing on loan at Scarborough, before joining Port Vale in 2000. He became the Vale's first choice keeper for a number of seasons until he was forced to retire due to injury in 2008. During his time at Vale Park he was made Player of the Year in 2001–02, and also picked up a Football League Trophy winner's medal in 2001. In all he made 250 competitive appearances in a ten years professional career, primarily in the third tier of the English Football League.

He turned to coaching after retiring as a player, working as a goalkeeping coach at Nottingham Forest, the JCB Academy, the Nike Academy, Barnsley and York City. He became an assistant manager at Hartlepool United in February 2023.

Playing career

Nottingham Forest
Goodlad kept goal for Barnsley schoolboys from the age of eleven to sixteen, spent time at the Rotherham United centre of excellence, and also represented England at under-15 level. He turned professional at Nottingham Forest, though did not make a first team appearance during the club's relegation from the Premier League in 1998–99. He was though loaned out to Third Division Scarborough in February, and played three games in what was the club's final season of league football.

Port Vale
Forest now in the First Division, he still failed to make it onto the pitch, and so in March 2000 he switched to league rivals Port Vale. Though he played only one game for the "Valiants" in 1999–2000, he was behind the more experienced Paul Musselwhite and his deputy Kevin Pilkington in the pecking order. After Musselwhite and Pilkington moved on in the summer, Goodlad's only competition for the number one jersey came from Irishman Dean Delany, also aged 20. A consistent Goodlad proved himself to be the superior talent, and went to make fifty appearances in 2000–01, also keeping goal in the club's 2001 Football League Trophy success at the Millennium Stadium. The young keeper also posted fifty appearances in the 2001–02 campaign, and was handed the club's Player of the Year award for his strong performances.

Recovering from a dislocated finger to make the start of the 2002–03 season, he went on to maintain his consistency over his 42 games despite the turmoil of the club entering administration. At the end of the season he was forced to undergo an operation on a finger injury, and thereby spend a lengthy time on the sidelines. He missed the entirety of the 2003–04 season due to his finger injury, and was forced to make his recovery in games held behind closed doors. A young Jonny Brain was signed to provide cover for Delany, but instead took his place as Vale's regular stopper during Goodlad's absence. He missed the start of 2004–05 with a thigh muscle injury, and only played twenty games all season.

Goodlad was back to his quiet and consistent best in 2005–06, posting 52 appearances in both league and cup, fending off competition from a teenage Joe Anyon. Throughout the season he faced four penalties, three of which he saved and one was of which hit the post. At the end of the campaign he put pen to paper on a new two-year deal, despite rumours that circulated on a fan site of a falling out with manager Martin Foyle – one of many rumours that "quite annoyed" many of the players.

The club's number one for the start of the 2006–07 campaign, injury struck him again, this time ending his career. Before this though, he had one of the finest games of his career, picking up the man-of-the match award in a League Cup clash with top-flight Tottenham Hotspur. He picked up his final injury on 30 December, in a game against Bristol City at Ashton Gate, after he got his ankle caught in mud and had to be stretchered off the field within the opening minutes. He ruptured his right achilles tendon and had to have reconstructive surgery. Following the incident Musselwhite was re-signed by the club on an emergency basis, now aged 38.

Goodlad played no part of the 2007–08 season, and announced his retirement on 2 January 2008 after it emerged that his Achilles tendon injury would need further surgery – surgery which carried the risk that he would have to use a wheelchair for the rest of his life. Goodlad opted to retire rather than risk handicapping himself. A benefit match was arranged for Goodlad – Port Vale Legends against Wolves legends at Vale Park on 6 August 2008. In May 2019, he was voted into the "Ultimate Port Vale XI" by members of the OneValeFan supporter website.

Coaching career
In September 2010, he was working as both a goalkeeping coach at Nottingham Forest and a sports teacher at the JCB Academy. He went on to work at the Nike Academy and later worked as head goalkeeper coach at Barnsley. In April 2022, he joined York City as goalkeeping coach. He left the role on the appointment of Joe Stead in January 2023. On 23 February 2023, he was appointed assistant manager to John Askey at League Two club Hartlepool United, the manager who had brought him to York City.

Career statistics

Honours
Individual
Port Vale F.C. Player of the Year: 2002

Port Vale
Football League Trophy: 2001

References

1979 births
Living people
Footballers from Barnsley
English footballers
England youth international footballers
Rotherham United F.C. players
Port Vale F.C. players
Scarborough F.C. players
Nottingham Forest F.C. players
Association football goalkeepers
English Football League players
Association football goalkeeping coaches
Nottingham Forest F.C. non-playing staff
Barnsley F.C. non-playing staff
York City F.C. non-playing staff
Hartlepool United F.C. non-playing staff